In the Hebrew Bible, the tithe of the tithes is a mitzvah (biblical requirement) for the recipient Levite to give to the priest a tenth (10%) of the tithe of produce that the former received from the Israelites. It applies only to agricultural produce grown in the Land of Israel.

This "tithe of the tithes" is a derivative of the tithe offering – a rabbinical Hebrew term based on the commandment in the Hebrew Bible to give a tithe  of 10% to the Levites. The first term, terumah, means offering. The term tithe offering, is alluded to in the Hebrew Bible text under the words "a tithe (tenth) of the tithe".

Hebrew Bible 
The term tithe occurs ten times in the Masoretic Text of the Hebrew Bible, in addition to the term  (Hebrew:  'tithe of the tithe', in the Septuagint Greek) which occurs once only in Nehemiah .

This offering is to be distinguished from the "offering tribute" which Moses gave to God in Numbers .

Rabbinical interpretation
Rather, it was given to a Levite, as the recipient of maaser rishon ('first tithe';), and then the Levite gave of ten percent of his  gift directly to the kohen. After the edict of Ezra, which directed  to be given to the priest, it became the Kohen's responsibility to give one tenth of his  gift to another priest of his choice.  

It could be eaten only by Jewish priests and their families, had to be ritually pure, had to be eaten while in a state of ritual purity, and could not be taken out of the Land of Israel.

In modern times 
Orthodox Judaism requires taking  from produce grown in Israel, although in the absence of a Temple it is no longer given to the priests. In contemporary practice, most of the Terumah and various other biblical tithes (including first tithe and second tithe are first set aside. The 'second tithe' is then redeemed upon a coin of nominal value (not generally equal to the value of the produce). The coin and the unredeemable portion of the produce are then discarded in a manner that prevents their use. The reason for discarding in such a manner is that taking these tithes are sacred and must be preserved in a state of "purity" and eaten by a priest in a state of purity. In contemporary times, all people are considered to be defiled by a type of "impurity" which can only be purified through the ritual of the red heifer. It has not been possible to perform this sacrifice since the destruction of the Second Temple. Since it is forbidden to defile , the produce must be discarded in a manner commensurate with its holiness.

See also 
 Heave offering, great tribute
 Maaser Rishon, first tithe
 Maaser Sheni, second tithe
 Maaser Ani, poor man's tithe

References

External links
Yeshivat Ohr Yerushalayim website
Rabbi Ashi Meir: Meaning in Mitzvot: Termah and Maaser. Orthodox Union

Jewish agrarian laws
Jewish sacrificial law
Land of Israel laws in Judaism
Positive Mitzvoth
Tithes in Judaism
Twenty-four kohanic gifts
Hebrew words and phrases in Jewish law
Hebrew words and phrases in the Hebrew Bible